Payson is a town in northern Gila County, Arizona, United States. Due to Payson's location being very near to the geographic center of Arizona, it has been called "The Heart of Arizona". The town is surrounded by the Tonto National Forest, the largest of the six national forests in Arizona and is the ninth largest national forest in the United States.[1][2] 

Payson boasts a lively festival calendar, including the World’s Oldest Continuous Rodeo, established in 1884 and the Old Time Fiddlers Contest which celebrates the area’s musical heritage.

As of the 2020 census, the population of Payson was 16,361.

History 

The founding year of Payson is considered to be 1882, at which time the town was known as "Green Valley". On March 3, 1884, a post office was established with the help of Illinois Representative Levi Joseph Payson. In honor of the representative's help, the town's name was changed to "Payson".

Payson had its first rodeo in 1884. The town declares the competition to be the world's oldest and continuous rodeo as it has been held every year since.

In 1918 author Zane Grey made his first trip to the area surrounding Payson. He would visit with regularity through 1929, and would purchase two plots of land near Tonto Creek, including  from Sampson Elam Boles under Myrtle Point. Grey wrote numerous books about the area and also filmed some movies, such as To the Last Man, in the Payson area in the 1920s.

During Prohibition the manufacture, sale, and distribution of liquor was plentiful. The transactions took place on historic Bootleg Alley.

During the 1930s an effort was begun to establish a better road from Payson to connect it to the outside world. At that time the town was very isolated, with a trip from Phoenix to Payson taking eight to twelve hours. Throughout the 1950s work on a paved road from Phoenix to Payson progressed, and the road was completed in 1958. The highway, State Route 87 (also known as the "Beeline Highway"), was later expanded to four lanes.

Ellison Creek & East Verde River flooding 

On July 15, 2017, heavy rains from upstream of the creek and river caused the waterways to swell, subsequently leading to downstream flooding which crucially affected the popular Water Wheel swimming hole where 10 people were killed and 4 others were injured during the flood event.

Geography
The Mogollon Rim, the southern boundary of the Colorado Plateau, lies to the north of Payson, with elevations exceeding ; there are many cold water lakes on top of the rim. They are stocked with fish by the Arizona Game and Fish Department.

Payson is bordered to the east by the town of Star Valley. Other nearby communities are Pine, Strawberry, Gisela and Rye, all within Gila County. State Route 87, the Beeline Highway, leads southwest  to Phoenix and northeast  to Winslow. State Route 260 leads east from Payson  to Show Low.

Zane Grey Country

"Zane Grey Country" is a term for the area around Payson. This term was most often used in the 1970s and 1980s, and appeared in the header of the local newspaper, the Payson Roundup. In recent times it has fallen somewhat out of favor, as the term "Rim Country" has become more popular among locals.

Climate
While average temperatures do reach the high 80s to mid 90s in summer, the town's altitude usually keeps it protected from the + temperatures usually found at Arizona's lower elevations. Monsoon storms often develop in the later afternoon, bring heavy rainfall to the area and also lower the temperature. Summer nights cool down into the 50s.

Winter is also mild, with cold nights.

The weather in Payson is varied, with snowstorms often followed by warm weather in which accumulated snowfall melts away within a day or two. In spring the desert blooms with a fiery array of Indian paintbrush, primrose, and the golds and fuchsias of cactus blossoms and other brightly colored wildflowers.

On Monday, November 5, 2001, between about 8 pm and 10:30 pm, Payson was treated to a rare display of the Northern Lights. It is extremely rare and only happens during solar flares due to the town's southern location. The lights appeared red in color.

<div style="width: 85%;">

Demographics

As of the census of 2019, there were 15,297 people living in Payson, AZ and is the 2,788th largest city in the United States. 5,832 households, and 4,070 families residing in the town. The population density was 791 people per square mile, which is 1275% higher than the Arizona average and 773% higher than the national average. The racial makeup of the town was 92.5% White, 0.2% Black or African American, 2.6% Native American, 0.5% Asian, <0.1% Pacific Islander, 3.0% from other races, and 1.3% from two or more races. 9.3% of the population were Hispanic or Latino of any race.

There were 5,832 households, out of which 21.7% had children under the age of 18 living with them, 58.6% were married couples living together, 8.0% had a female householder with no husband present, and 30.2% were non-families. 26.0% of all households were made up of individuals, and 14.6% had someone living alone who was 65 years of age or older. The average household size was 2.30 and the average family size was 2.71.

In the town, the population was spread out, with 18.1% under the age of 18, 4.6% from 18 to 24, 15.3% from 25 to 44, 25.9% from 45 to 64, and 36.2% who were 65 years of age or older. The median age was 57.1 years. This is approximately 54% higher than the Arizona average of 37. The male/female ratio was 0.9:1. English was spoken by 93% of people and Spanish was spoken by 5% of people.

The median income for a household in the town was $33,638, and the median income for a family was $38,713. Males had a median income of $30,900 versus $23,750 for females. The per capita income for the town was $19,513. About 6.5% of families and 9.9% of the population were below the poverty line, including 15.1% of those under age 18 and 4.7% of those age 65 or over.

Recreation

The United States Forest Service has jurisdiction of 97% of the land around Payson; the town is surrounded by the Tonto National Forest or by tribal governments. Much of the land is available for recreational activities. Payson also has many hiking trails available to use. The Tonto Natural Bridge, the largest known natural bridge in the world, is located just northwest of Payson in Tonto Natural Bridge State Park, a unit of the Arizona State Park system. The area incorporates three golf courses, two of which belong to private country clubs. Mazatzal Casino, a tribal casino, is operated by the Tonto Apache Indian Reservation near the south end of the city.

The Payson area is a popular destination for rock hounds. In various areas surrounding the community quartz crystals can be found, some rivaling Herkimer diamonds in quality, as well as geodes, agate and onyx. Fossils are commonly found in the Paleozoic strata that is exposed along the Mogollon Rim to the north and west of Payson along State Route 87 and State Route 260.

Payson has two parks, Green Valley Park and Rumsey Park. It also has two lakes, which are part of the Urban Fish Program. A community swimming pool is located near Rumsey Park, and the town hosts free outdoor concerts in the summer. Other activities include intramural sports like baseball and football. Payson also has a small skate park.

Payson hosts a Fourth of July fireworks display at Green Valley Park.

Culture

Payson is the site of the annual Arizona State Championship Old Time Fiddlers Contest, held in September. The fiddle contest features both local and nationally known players and awards cash prizes.

Rodeos
Payson hosts two rodeos.  In May, the Multi-Purpose Event Center near the Tonto Apache Indian Reservation hosts the Gary Hardt Memorial Rodeo. In August, the historic August Doin's Rodeo (1884) takes place making Payson the "Home of the World's Oldest Continuous Rodeo". Prescott, Arizona, 100 miles to the northwest, is known for hosting the "World's Oldest Rodeo" (1888), but took a hiatus during World War II.

Public services

Education
The town is served by the Payson Unified School District.

A branch of Gila Community College is located in Payson.

Police department
The Payson Police Department serves both the Town of Payson and Town of Star Valley. , the department is authorized to staff 32 sworn officers which includes the chief, lieutenant, five sergeants, four detectives, two school resource officers, two speciality positions (GIITEM and Traffic), and patrol. In 2021, officers responded to more than 16,000 calls for service.

The police department also staffs a 24/7 dispatch center that is the primary public safety answering point (PSAP) for northern Gila County. In addition to dispatching for Payson PD, they also dispatch for the Tonto Apache Police Department, Town of Payson Fire Department, Hellsgate Fire District, Pine/Strawberry Fire District, Christopher Kohls Fire District, Waterwheel Fire District, and Gisela Valley Fire District.

Transportation

The Payson Senior Center operates the Beeline Bus, which provides local bus service to Payson, Star Valley, and Mesa del Caballo. Mountain Valley Shuttle stops in Payson on its Phoenix–Show Low route.

Historic structures

The following are images of some of the historic structures recognized by the local government.
 The Haught Cabin – Henry and Sarah Haught built their log cabin in 1904 of alternating layers of logs and chinking in Roberts Mesa. The Haught's cabin measured 10′ by 18′. It had a dirt floor and no windows. The cabin was moved to Tonto Creek and by 1930, it was abandoned. In 1999, the cabin was moved once more, this time to the Green Valley Park and reassembled on the museum's grounds which is located at 700 South Green Valley Parkway.
 The Sidles Mud House – Henry Sidles built the poured mud home in 1882. The mud house, located at 505A W. Main Street, was later purchased by August and Wilhelmina Pieper.
 The Pieper Mansion – August and Wilhelmina Pieper built a new house which became known as the "Pieper Mansion" in 1893. Located at 505 W. Main Street, the Piepers moved in and used the Sidles mud house for storage.
 The Ranger Station – This is the oldest Ranger Station still standing in the Southwest. It belonged to the Payson Ranger District of the National Tonto Forest. The station was built in 1907.
 The Ranger Family House – was built in 1933 and is the oldest Ranger Family House still standing in the Southwest.
 The Ranger Office – was built in 1932 and together with the Ranger Station and the Ranger Family House completes the ranger complex of the Payson Ranger District. The three properties are located on the grounds of what is now the Green Valley Park.
 The Ox Bow Inn and Saloon – built in 1933 and located at 607 W Main Street. The log inn was built as the Payson Hotel and the restaurant was named the Busy Bee. In 1945 the business was purchased and expanded by Jimmy Cox, who renamed the hotel the Ox Bow Inn. The property was listed in the National Register of Historic Places on October 1, 2004, ref.: #04001073.
 The Tonto Natural Bridge – The landscape formation is believed to be the largest natural travertine bridge in the world.

References

External links
 Town of Payson official website
 Payson Roundup, local newspaper
 Payson visitors' site
 Tonto Natural Bridge State Park
 Tonto National Forest

Populated places of the Mogollon Rim
Micropolitan areas of Arizona
Towns in Gila County, Arizona
Populated places established in 1882
1882 establishments in Arizona Territory